Sukhteh Kish (also Romanized as Sūkhteh Kīsh; also known as Sūkhteh Kesh) is a village in Shabkhus Lat Rural District, Rankuh District, Amlash County, Gilan Province, Iran. At the 2006 census, its population was 441, in 119 families.

References 

Populated places in Amlash County